Clarissa is a novel by Samuel Richardson.

Clarissa can also refer to:

 Clarissa (given name), a female given name, from the Latin name Clarissa, nun of the Order of St Clare
 Clarissa (film), a 1941 German film
 Clarissa Explains It All, a U.S. television sitcom
 Clarissa (TV series), a British television drama series
 302 Clarissa, an asteroid
 Clarissa, Minnesota, a small city in the United States
 Clarissa Oakes, a novel
 Clarissa (opera), an opera based on the Richardson novel by Robin Holloway
 Clarissa (Stefan Zweig), a novel by Stefan Zweig

See also 
 Clarisse (disambiguation)